The Catholic University of Cameroon (CATUC), or in Latin (Universitas Catholica Cameruniae) is a private university located in Bamenda in the North West region of the Republic of Cameroon. It is the Provincial University of the Catholic Church in the Anglophone part of Cameroon and the only Catholic Institution of Higher Education founded by the Anglophone Catholic Bishops of the Ecclesiastical Province of Bamenda. It provides undergraduate, graduate and professional studies in both the arts and the sciences.

The faculties and schools are spread across the dioceses of Bamenda Ecclesiastical Province, with the main campus located in Bamenda. While the main campus is being developed, the university is operating at the Saint Joseph’s Catholic Cathedral Primary School.

Professors and Lecturers at the University are recruited from sacred (i.e., theology, canon law, etc.)  and secular disciplines (e.g., letters, philosophy, education, social sciences, economics). The majority of degrees and diplomas awarded by the Catholic University of Cameroon, Bamenda are state-authorized diplomas, as the university is certified to issue them by the Ministry of Higher Education. Theological degrees are awarded in the name of the Holy See and are the result of a prescribed course of study in the ecclesiastical faculty of theology.

References

External links

Cameroon's Ministry of Higher Education
The School of Law of the Catholic University of Cameroon (CATUC), Bamenda has its Main Campus at the Roman Catholic Diocese of Buea 
The Catholic School of Health Sciences
The School of Health Sciences of the Catholic University of Cameroon (CATUC)

Universities in Cameroon
Catholic universities and colleges in Africa
Bamenda